Gene Simmons Vault is a box set of 10 CDs, 151 songs selected from demos made by Kiss vocalist and bass player Gene Simmons  during his entire career (1966-2016). It is packaged in a specially designed road case and includes in addition to the discs also bonus material - a Gene Simmons action figure, a book and a medallion. It has been announced that the three unreleased demos Gene Simmons made with Alex and Eddie Van Halen of multiplatinum rockers Van Halen in the 1970s will be part of this box set.

The initial run is a limited edition that will be personally delivered by Simmons to the purchaser, and the meeting can be arranged in three different formats.

- The standard Vault experience, a meeting in a specified location with a group of fans who have purchased the box set and booked this event - offered at $2000.

- "the Gene Simmons Vault Home Experience." – Simmons will personally make the delivery to your home - offered at $50,000

-  the "Producer Experience," in which purchasing fans are given exclusive studio time with Simmons in addition to access to more unreleased recordings. - offered at $25,000

On January 5, 2018 the news section of the official site released the track listing for all 10 discs, plus a bonus disc.

Track listing

References

Gene Simmons albums
2017 compilation albums
Albums produced by Gene Simmons
Demo albums
Rhino Records albums